Ralph Sewer is a retired fireman and Australian rules footballer who played for both the Woodville Football Club and Glenelg Football Club in the South Australian National Football League. Sewer played 12 matches for South Australia. Sewer is also the only player to have played in four decades of football in SANFL.

References

Woodville Football Club players
South Australian Football Hall of Fame inductees
1951 births
Living people
Glenelg Football Club players